Diospyros britannoborneensis is a tree in the family Ebenaceae. The twigs dry greyish or blackish. The tree is named for the part of northern Borneo formerly known as British Borneo. D. britannoborneensis is endemic to Borneo.

References

britannoborneensis
Endemic flora of Borneo
Trees of Borneo
Plants described in 1938